John "Soap" MacTavish is a fictional character in the Call of Duty story arc Modern Warfare. He first appears as a main playable character in the 2007 video game Call of Duty 4: Modern Warfare where he is part of the 22nd Special Air Service (SAS) regiment as a sniper and demolitions expert. He later appears in the sequel Call of Duty: Modern Warfare 2, released in November 2009, as both an NPC and as one of the playable characters. He also appeared in Call of Duty: Modern Warfare 3, released in November 2011. The reboot version of Soap was briefly mentioned in the 2019 reboot title Call of Duty: Modern Warfare and its battle royale companion mode Call of Duty: Warzone, where he is featured as a playable character, before making his full debut in Call of Duty: Modern Warfare II. Soap was well received by critics and became one of the most popular Call of Duty characters.

Overview 
John "Soap" MacTavish plays a key role in the storyline of Call of Duty 4: Modern Warfare where he is on the front lines of the fight against the Ultra-nationalists as part of the SAS, more specifically Captain Price's Bravo Team. In Call of Duty 4: Modern Warfare, the player experiences the storyline through the eyes of Soap. However, certain missions were played from a different characters perspective. Soap appears to be modeled after the character "Lake" in the 2003 movie Tears of the Sun.

The later games present MacTavish as a non-playable character (NPC) that the playable character fights alongside. However, in Call of Duty: Modern Warfare 2 the player takes control of MacTavish in the final three missions. In the final game in the series, MacTavish appears as a playable character only for the first mission then reverts to an NPC for the remainder of the storyline.

MacTavish is later killed in action during the course of Call of Duty: Modern Warfare 3 after an explosion where he experiences massive blood loss, whilst on a mission to assassinate Vladimir Makarov, a continuing antagonist of the series appearing in all three titles. MacTavish is voiced by Scottish actor Kevin McKidd in Modern Warfare 2 and Modern Warfare 3.

The developers of Call of Duty: Ghosts added a DLC (Downloadable Content Package) which allowed the player to play as the iconic character called the Soap Legend Pack which was released in April 2014.

The fourth season of Call of Duty: Mobile features Soap as a playable avatar upon purchase of the season battle pass.

In the 2019 reboot title Call of Duty: Modern Warfare, Soap was first teased during the ending of the single player campaign as a recruit for Task Force 141. In a story cinematic for the battle royale companion game Call of Duty: Warzone, Soap made his first appearance in voice only, portrayed by Neil Ellice. In August 2021, Soap was added to Modern Warfare and Warzone as a playable Operator character.

Appearances

Original Modern Warfare sub-series

Call of Duty 4: Modern Warfare 
MacTavish is first introduced in the opening mission, after having been selected for the 22nd SAS, based at Hereford. He is introduced to fellow squadmates as well as his new commanding officer, Captain John Price, where he undergoes a routine training exercise in the killing house before proceeding on a mission to infiltrate a container ship in the Bering Strait and retrieve a nuclear device. He is part of the team responsible for the capture and execution of Khaled Al-Asad, the man responsible for the detonation of a similar nuclear device in an unnamed Middle Eastern country, and also the death of Imran Zakhaev, the man responsible for providing Al-Asad nuclear weapons. Soap is part of Bravo Team, which works with US Marine Force Recon in disabling nuclear missiles which Zakhaev launched at the shores of the United States, where he later kills Zakhaev after an Mi-24 Hind destroys a major bridge on their evacuation route. Soap and Price are barely spared the untimely death their squad received when a diversion created by Russian loyalists buys Soap time sufficient to kill Zakhaev and two soldiers with Price's M1911 pistol, and is then rescued by Kamarov's men .

Call of Duty: Modern Warfare 2 

Five years later, Soap is the captain of Task Force 141, a promotion he received in the aftermath of Operation Kingfish, where Price was captured and taken to a gulag in eastern Russia after an attempt on the life of Vladimir Makarov, Zakhaev's former top lieutenant. He appears on the mission "Cliffhanger" as an NPC, assisting the player's character, Gary "Roach" Sanderson. In the following mission where the player controls Roach, MacTavish and his team capture the right-hand man of an arms dealer and interrogate him, which then leads them to hunt for Alejandro Rojas, whom they captured in time, which leads to the rescue of Captain Price – the man Makarov hates most. In the final three missions of the game, he and Price discover that their commanding officer, Lt. General Shepherd had double-crossed them, but are unable to warn their team (Simon "Ghost" Riley and Roach) in time and they are subsequently killed. After battling through a massive battalion of armed military contractors (dubbed Shadow Company), Soap attempts to kill Shepherd with his combat knife, but Shepherd manages to stab him in the chest. With Shepherd distracted by a hand to hand duel with Price, and with what little strength he has left, Soap pulls the knife from his chest and throws it, directly hitting Shepherd in his eye and killing him instantly. Price patches up Soap as their friend Nikolai lands near their pickup point and extracts them to safety, setting the stage for Call of Duty: Modern Warfare 3.

Call of Duty: Modern Warfare 3 
Hours after being extracted from Site Hotel Bravo, Task Force 141 has been disavowed and a dying Soap has been extracted to a Russian loyalist holdout in India. With Makarov on their trail to tie up loose ends and a quick patch job by a loyalist doctor, loyalist Yuri joins Bravo Team in escaping the relentless assault by Russian ultranationalists loyal to Makarov to lay low while Russia is engaged in all-out combat with the United States across the eastern seaboard. Sometime later, Price contacts former 141 operator Sandman whom they worked with during Operation Kingfish for assistance with leads on Makarov's location, as well as SAS commanding officer MacMillan, Price's former captain in the SAS with whom he worked during the initial attempt to kill Imran Zakhaev 20 years prior. After retrieving intel from a number of sources and with help from loyalist Kamarov, the team is able to lock down Makarov's location in a martial law run-down Prague, in the Czech Republic, where Makarov is expected to attend a high-level meeting with other senior officials in his organization. Makarov, however, is aware that 141 is in the city, and, after letting Yuri know he shouldn't have come after them, activates bomb charges intended to kill Soap and Yuri both. Soap saves Yuri's life by pushing him out of the window at the last moment, and is then jettisoned himself from a very high elevation, at which point Soap's previous knife wound is reopened. During an attempted extraction, Soap dies from massive blood loss moments after informing Price that Makarov knows Yuri. Soap is later mentioned by Price when the latter calls MacMillan to let him know that Soap has died and pleads for help in finding Makarov's location. He is mentioned one final time at the beginning of the last mission of the game by Price, who the player takes control of, when he and Yuri suit up in EOD armor, says "This is for Soap."

Rebooted Modern Warfare sub-series

Call of Duty: Modern Warfare / Call of Duty: Warzone 
Following the death of General Roman Barkov, Captain John Price meets up with Kate Laswell to discuss the formation of Task Force 141, in preparation against the Russian terrorist Victor Zakhaev. Price receives the dossiers of several potential recruits from Laswell, among which John "Soap" MacTavish was named. At some unknown point during 2020, Soap is officially recruited to join Task Force 141, though he does not participate in the operations in Verdansk alongside Price and the other Task Force members. After Price successfully stops Victor Zakhaev from launching nuclear missiles to destroy Verdansk, he is contacted by Soap, who states that he is "half a klick off the coast."

Call of Duty: Modern Warfare II 
Modern Warfare II (2022 reboot) is a continuation of the 2019 reboot. Soap's role in the campaign starts with meeting Ghost, their mission to capture Quds Force Major Hassan Zyani who was funding terrorist activity. They fail to capture Hassan and instead find that he has missiles. Soap and Ghost continue to track him, working with Mexican Special Forces, specifically Colonel Alejandro Vargas, his second-in-command Sergeant Major Rodolfo "Rudy" Parra, and the Los Vaqueros ("cowboys"). Shadow Company, an elite private military unit led by Phillip Graves, helps them capture Hassan, but they have to release him to avoid political fallout. They then capture the Las Almas leader, El Sin Nombre, revealed to be Vargas' former teammate Valeria Garza to get information on where Hassan is going and where the missiles are being stored. Shadow Company betrays them, Soap and Ghost managing to flee into Las Almas avoiding Shadow Company. They meet up with Captain Price to free Alejandro and the Los Vaqueros from Shadow Company. It is revealed that Shepherd and Graves ran an illegal mission transporting the missiles, which was then ambushed with the Shadow Company team being killed and the missiles stolen. Soap manages to kill Graves and they learn that the last missile is in Chicago. Task Force 141 raids the building Hassan is in, with Soap managing to get the missile controls and blow it up in the sky. Ghost kills Hassan before he throws Soap out of an open window .

Other appearances 
Due to the popularity of the character, an Xbox 360 user avatar was released for purchase, which allows players to look like Soap. Similar to the Call of Duty character Captain Price, MacTavish appears in a video posted on YouTube by Machinima entitled "Captain MacTavish Plays Halo 3", as part of their Call of Duty and Halo crossover series. The character also appears in the Soap Legend Pack, a DLC for Call of Duty: Ghosts where Soap is a playable multiplayer character. This was released on 22 April 2014. On 22 November a mobile app designed for iOS and Windows Phone entitled Call of Duty: Heroes was released which featured Soap as a character that the player could control once unlocked. The fourth season of Call of Duty: Mobile features Soap as a playable avatar if the player purchases the Disavowed Battle Pass.  The season also included weapons, equipment and vehicles with MacTavish themed skins.

Reception 
The character was well received by many fans of the Call of Duty franchise. An online poll on the Guinness World Records 2011 Gamers' Edition, which involved over 13,000 gamers voting, placed John "Soap" MacTavish in 12th place out of a list of 50 fictional game characters. In 2021, Matthew Wilkinson of TheGamer ranked Soap the greatest Call of Duty character, writing he "was not only the greatest character in the history of Call of Duty (to this point), but he has also become one of the most beloved characters in gaming, full stop." Complexs Gus Turner included Soap on his "25 Dead Video Game Characters We Wish Were Still Here", saying "After playing with him through multiple CoD titles, losing Soap was like saying goodbye to an old friend." Tom Senior of PC Gamer described Soap's death in Modern Warfare 3 as among "the most crushing" video game deaths.

Soap's return was highly anticipated in the reboot series, but many were disappointed by the character's physical appearance upon his release in Warzone, criticizing it as not looking alike to his original counterpart and mocking it with the name "Shampoo".

Notes

References

External links
John "Soap" MacTavish at IMDb
Giant Bomb: John MacTavish

Activision characters
Call of Duty
Fictional British Army officers
Fictional British people in video games
Fictional British military snipers
Fictional military captains
Fictional outlaws
Fictional Scottish people
Fictional Somali Civil War veterans
Fictional Special Air Service personnel
Fictional World War III veterans
First-person shooter characters
Male characters in video games
Fictional soldiers in video games
Video game characters introduced in 2007
Video game protagonists